The Age of Shadows (lit. "Emissary") is a 2016 South Korean period action thriller film directed by Kim Jee-woon and written by Lee Ji-min and Park Jong-dae. The film is set in Shanghai and Seoul in the 1920s and stars Song Kang-ho and Gong Yoo. It was selected as the South Korean entry for the Best Foreign Language Film at the 89th Academy Awards, but it was not nominated.

The film won the Best Picture award in the Action Features category at the 2016 Fantastic Fest held in Austin, Texas.

Plot 
Korean police captain Lee Jung-chool (Song Kang-ho) has been charged by the Japanese colonial government with rooting out members of the country's resistance movement. But while Lee has a history of selling out his own people to secure a favorable position with the Japanese, he’s been hit harder than usual by the death of Kim Jang-ok (Park Hee-soon), a resistance fighter who used to be his classmate. The leader of the resistance, Che-san (Lee Byung-hun), senses that this turncoat, if approached and handled properly, might be turned once more — this time in their favor. And so begins an incremental, coded psychological dance between Lee and a key resistance figure named Kim Woo-jin (Gong Yoo), whose antique shop is a front for a scheme to smuggle explosives from Shanghai into Seoul.

Cast 

 Song Kang-ho as Lee Jung-chool
 Gong Yoo as Kim Woo-jin
 Han Ji-min as Yeon Gye-soon
 Uhm Tae-goo as Hashimoto
 Shin Sung-rok as Jo Hwe-ryung
 Heo Sung-tae as Ha Il-soo
 Lee Seol-goo as Oh Nam-won
 Shingo Tsurumi as Higashi
 Kim Dong-young as Ha Chul-joo
 Jung Yoo-ahn as Hwang Ui-seo
 Go Jun as Shim Sang-do
 Seo Young-joo as Joo Dong-sung
 Kwon Soo-hyun as Sun-gil
 Lee Hwan as Park Dae-yi
 Kwak Ja-hyung as Seo Jin-dol
 Oh Ha-nee as Hwang Seo-im
 Yoo Sang-jae as Hunter Park
 Jo Young-gyu as Kim Hak-jin
 Choi Yu-hwa as Kim Sa-hee
 Han Soo-yeon as Mae-hyang
 Nam Moon-chul as Kim Hwang-sub
 Kim Soo-woong as Saito
 Choi Jang-won as Noh Duk-soo
 Heo Hyung-gyu as Jung Woo-sik
 Baek In-kwon as Park Woong
 Jung Do-won as Woo Ma-e
 Lee Soo-kwang as Hideo
 Hiromitsu Takeda as Takeda
 Shin Sung-il as Park Ga
 Kim Ui-gun as Heo Jung-goo
 Foster Burden as Ludvik 
 Izo Oikawa as Umano
 Kazuhiko Ikebe as Nakada
 Lee Byung-hun as Jung Chae-san (cameo) 
 Park Hee-soon as Kim Jang-ok (special appearance)

Production 
On August 3, 2015, it was announced that Warner Bros. would finance and distribute its first ever Korean-language 1930s set drama Secret Agent, and the $8.62 million budgeted film would also be produced by Grimm Pictures. The project and script was developed by Lee Ji-min and Park Jong-dae, which Kim Jee-woon would direct and the cast would be Song Kang-ho and Gong Yoo. A trailer was released on July 14, 2016, revealing the new title as The Age of Shadows.

Critical reception
The film has received critical acclaim. On Rotten Tomatoes, it holds an approval rating of 100%, based on 41 reviews with an average rating of 7.3/10. On Metacritic, it holds a weighted average score of 78/100, based on 14 reviews, indicating "generally favorable reviews".

The Film Stage gave the film a positive review, writes "In short, mainstream audiences should get a kick out of this polished, often exciting patriotist drama. But those looking for a deeper, mightier resonance would be well advised to keep their expectations in check."

The Hollywood Reporter describes the film as "a patriotic costumer" and says, "Several impressive action scenes sustain the tension and electrify this overlong, often hard-to-follow story".

Variety wrote, "Cult director Kim Jee-woon delivers the goods with an ultra-stylish cloak-and-dagger actioner".

Screendaily noted that, "Local audiences should respond well to the stirring patriotic sentiment on display here".

Box office
The film topped the South Korean box office for three consecutive weeks.

Awards and nominations

See also
 Assassination, a 2015 South Korean film with similar topic and background
 List of submissions to the 89th Academy Awards for Best Foreign Language Film
 List of South Korean submissions for the Academy Award for Best Foreign Language Film

References

External links

2016 action thriller films
2010s spy thriller films
2016 films
Films directed by Kim Jee-woon
Films set in the 1920s
Films set in Korea under Japanese rule
South Korean action thriller films
South Korean spy thriller films
Warner Bros. films
South Korean historical action films
Historical action films
2010s South Korean films